= Dawes Creek =

Stream in Wisconsin, United States

Coordinates: 44°25′57″N 90°01′45″W

Dawes Creek is a stream in the U.S. state of Wisconsin. It is a tributary to Hemlock Creek.

Dawes Creek most likely has the name of the local Dawes family, the first member of which arrived to Wood County in 1850.
